The .500 A-Square is a belted, bottleneck rifle cartridge, developed by Arthur Alphin in 1976. The cartridge is based on the .460 Weatherby Magnum necked up to accept the .510 in (13.0 mm) bullet; the same as the .50 BMG cartridge. This was Col. Alphin's first commercial sporting cartridge and was designed in “response to some severe problems experienced with the .458 Winchester on safari in Mozambique.”

The .500 A-Square was a proprietary cartridge and the world's most powerful commercially available “sporting” cartridge. However, the .50 BMG is the world's most powerful commercial cartridge for any shooting purpose. The .500 A-Square is used specifically as an African, thick skin, dangerous game, rifle cartridge for the hunting of elephants and Cape buffalo as well as a backup gun for professional hunters and guides.

Overview
The .500 A-Square cartridge was commercially available from both A-Square and Midway USA as loaded ammunition. The ammunition comes in three loads: 600 grains (38.9 g) Monolithic Solid; 600 grains (38.9 g) soft nose thick jacket and 600 gr (38.9 g) soft nose thin jacket. All bullet/cartridge combination are advertised with a muzzle velocity of 2470 ft/s (753 m/s) and muzzle energy of 8127 ft lbf (11019 J).

In comparison: the parent cartridge, the .460 Weatherby Magnum as commercial loaded with a 500 gr (32.4 g) Monolithic Solid has a muzzle velocity of 2580 ft/s (786 m/s) and muzzle energy of 7389 ft lbf (10018 J). The .50 BMG as commercial loaded with a 661 gr (42.8 g) FMJ M33 ball ammo has a muzzle velocity of 2750 ft/s (838 m/s) and muzzle energy of 11102 ft lbf (15052 J).

Although there is limited hand-loading information, bullet weights (hunting) are from between 300 gr (19.4) to 647 gr (41.9).

A-Square Company
In October 2011, A-Square ceased all ammunition operations.

References

Pistol and rifle cartridges
Wildcat cartridges